ILS Law College, or in its full name Indian Law Society's Law College, is a government-aided law school in Pune, India.  It was established in 1924 and offers courses that include three-year and five-year degrees. ILS is located on Law College Road, Pune. The college was aided by The Ford Foundation.

History 
The Indian Law Society was established on 4 March 1923 as a Public Charitable Trust registered under the Societies Registration Act.  The society established the eponymous Law College with the objective of providing facilities for the study of law on a scientific basis with proper training.

The college was affiliated with the University of Bombay, but with the founding of the University of Pune in 1949, the college became a constituent of the latter.

Campus 
The ILS campus is located at the centre of Law College Road between the FTII (Film and Television Institute) and the Bhandarkar Research Institute. The Sarswati Building houses the library, the reading room, the administrative office, the conference hall and the Principal's office, besides the chambers of other faculty members and computer facilities for research students. The Lakshmi Building has eighteen halls for regular lectures, the legal aid centre and an auditorium with a capacity of 400 people, used for guest lectures, college functions and presentations.

Apart from the academic and administrative buildings, the College facilities are further enriched with a huge residential complex for male students; the newly constructed Ladies Hostel, a gymnasium, a cricket and football ground, a sports pavilion housing the indoor sports facilities, tennis courts and a swimming pool to maintain physical health.

Housed on a floor of the Sarswati building, the ILS library includes over 45,000 books and volumes of periodicals, journals and magazines. It subscribes to over 95 Indian and foreign journals each year, including the All England Reports, The American Journal of Comparative Law, and The Cambridge and Oxford Law Journals. It offers computer and photocopying facilities to its students as well as an online search catalog. The library has an inter-library loan network with other libraries in Pune.

Academics

Academic programmes 
In addition to the five-year degree course and the three-year degree course (for graduates in any discipline), the college offers diplomas and distance-learning courses.

ILS is part of the EU Law Poros Programme, and students can apply for this diploma course.  The best students from the programme get a chance to go on an exchange program to Greece for a semester of study there.

Rankings
 
ILS Law College was ranked tenth by India Todays "India's Best Colleges 2022: Law".

Student life
The college devotes attention to creating a Moot Court atmosphere; ILS has debating cells, cultural cells, a corporate cell, a center for public law, an alternate dispute resolution cell, Intellectual Property Rights Cell, International Law Cell, Hariyali cell etc.

The college has a legal aid programme involving final year students, and runs legal literacy programmes for lay people. For instance, in a project with the KEM Hospital research centre, a village is selected and students sent there to spread legal literacy. This project covers issues like human rights, gender and civil rights. Students also put on street plays to make citizens aware of legal issues.

In conjunction with the Rotary circuit, ILS students go to a legal centre four days a week. The centre gets clients through various NGOs active in Pune. The legal centre also has lawyers on hand to help people in need of counselling. However, the college advocates out-of-court settlements to lengthy litigation.

One of the institution's projects involves working with the National Commission for Women. The college is active in human rights projects which are handled by the student members Human Rights Cell of the college.

The institution has been a partner institute for Surana & Surana International Technology Law Moot Court Competition from 2002 to 2008.

Notable alumni 

 Yashwantrao Chavan, former deputy PM of India, First Chief Minister of Maharashtra
 Yeshwant Vishnu Chandrachud former Chief Justice of India
 E S Venkataramiah, 19th Chief Justice of India
 P. B. Gajendragadkar, 7th Chief Justice of India, serving from February 1964 to March 1966.
 Sushil Kumar Shinde, Home Minister.
 Vilasrao Deshmukh, two time chief minister of Maharashtra and a former union minister
 Gopinath Pandurang Munde, former deputy chief minister of State of Maharashtra, former Union Minister.
 M. C. Chagla, former Cabinet Minister and Chief Justice of the Bombay High Court
 Mohan Dharia (b. 1925), Padma Vibhushan, former Union minister, social worker
 Balasaheb Thorat Minister for revenue in Maharashtra state
 Rajiv Satav Member of Rajyasabha, Former Member of Loksabha 
 Muhammed Hamdulla Sayeed, youngest Congress MP in India elected from the Lakshadweep Constituency
 Kona Prabhakara Rao, Governor of Sikkim
 Devesh Chandra Thakur, member of Bihar Legislative Council & former Cabinet minister in Bihar
 Ramrao Adik, former Deputy Chief Minister of Maharashtra
 K. Hanumanthaiah, Second Chief Minister of Karnataka
 S. Nijalingappa, Fourth Chief Minister of Karnataka
 T. Madiah Gowda, Member of first lok sabha
 Vandana Chavan Member of Rajya Sabha & former mayor of Pune 
 B. G. Kolse Patil Former Judge
 Shankarrao Bajirao Patil, politician
 Panchi Bora, TV actress
 Ashok Chhotelal Agarwal, Chief Justice of Madras High Court

Notes

References

External links
 ILS Law College website

Law schools in Maharashtra
Universities and colleges in Pune
Colleges affiliated to Savitribai Phule Pune University
Educational institutions established in 1924
1924 establishments in India